Peja Drobnjak (born 27 October 1975) is a Montenegrin professional basketball scout and former player. At , he played at the power forward and center positions. Throughout his nineteen-year career, Drobnjak has spent three full seasons playing in the NBA.

Professional career

Europe
Drobnjak started his professional career with Partizan in the 1992–93 season. He played six seasons for Partizan, winning three national titles in a row (1995, 1996 and 1997). In his last year with the club, Drobnjak played in the EuroLeague Final Four, where they finished fourth, after losing in the semifinals to Kinder Bologna, and in the third-place game against Benetton Treviso.

Before the 1998–99 season, Drobnjak signed with Efes Pilsen, in Turkey. Drobnjak stayed for the next three seasons with Efes.

NBA
Drobnjak was a second-round draft choice of the Washington Bullets in the 1997 NBA draft. During his time in the NBA, Drobnjak played two seasons for the Seattle SuperSonics, one season for the Los Angeles Clippers, and one season for the Atlanta Hawks. In 2004, the Clippers made him available for selection by the Charlotte Bobcats in the expansion draft. After his selection by the Bobcats, Drobnjak was subsequently traded to the Atlanta Hawks in exchange for a 2005 second-round draft pick before playing a game for Charlotte.

Return to Europe
In July 2005, Drobnjak signed a three-year contract with Tau Cerámica in Spain. However, he was released after only a year, which followed by his signing a one-year contract with his former team Partizan.

In July 2007, he signed with Akasvayu Girona. In December 2007, he left Girona and signed with Beşiktaş Cola Turka for the rest of the season. In November 2008, Drobnjak returned to Efes Pilsen for the 2008–09 season. In the 2009–10 season, Drobnjak played in the Greek Basket League with PAOK. In February 2011, he signed with Iraklis until the end of the season. However, he decided to retire later that month.

National team career
Drobnjak won gold medals at both the 1998 and 2002 FIBA World Championships, and he also won a gold medal at the EuroBasket 2001, while playing with the senior Yugoslav national team.

Post-playing career 
In 2015, Drobnjak was named a scout for the Sacramento Kings.

NBA career statistics

Regular season

|-
| align="left" | 2001–02
| align="left" | Seattle
| 64 || 12 || 18.3 || .461 || .000 || .753 || 3.4 || .8 || .3 || .5 || 6.8
|-
| align="left" | 2002–03
| align="left" | Seattle
| 82 || 69 || 24.2 || .412 || .353 || .791 || 3.9 || 1.0 || .6 || .5 || 9.4
|-
| align="left" | 2003–04
| align="left" | L.A. Clippers
| 61 || 14 || 15.6 || .393 || .306 || .849 || 3.2 || .6 || .4 || .4 || 6.3
|-
| align="left" | 2004–05
| align="left" | Atlanta
| 71 || 1 || 20.2 || .438 || .352 || .800 || 3.4 || .7 || .6 || .3 || 8.4
|- class="sortbottom"
| style="text-align:center;" colspan="2"| Career
| 278 || 96 || 19.9 || .425 || .340 || .799 || 3.5 || .8 || .5 || .4 || 7.9

Playoffs

|-
| align="left" | 2002
| align="left" | Seattle
| 3 || 1 || 12.7 || .333 || .000 || .500 || 2.7 || .7 || .3 || .0 || 3.3

See also 
 List of European basketball players in the United States
 List of Montenegrin NBA players

References

External links
 Drobnjak's Manjaks
 Predrag Drobnjak at NBA.com
 Predrag Drobnjak at ACB.com 
 Predrag Drobnjak at Eurobasket.com
 Predrag Drobnjak at Euroleague.net
 Predrag Drobnjak at TBLStat.net
 Predrag Drobnjak at Basketball-Reference.com

1975 births
Living people
ABA League players
Anadolu Efes S.K. players
Atlanta Hawks players
Basketball players at the 2000 Summer Olympics
Basketball players at the 2004 Summer Olympics
Beşiktaş men's basketball players
CB Girona players
Centers (basketball)
Charlotte Bobcats expansion draft picks
FIBA EuroBasket-winning players
FIBA World Championship-winning players
Greek Basket League players
Iraklis Thessaloniki B.C. players
KK Partizan players
Liga ACB players
Los Angeles Clippers players
Montenegrin basketball scouts
Montenegrin expatriate basketball people in Greece
Montenegrin expatriate basketball people in Spain
Montenegrin expatriate basketball people in Serbia
Montenegrin expatriate basketball people in the United States
Montenegrin men's basketball players
National Basketball Association players from Montenegro
National Basketball Association scouts from Europe
Olympic basketball players of Serbia and Montenegro
Olympic basketball players of Yugoslavia
P.A.O.K. BC players
People from Bijelo Polje
Power forwards (basketball)
Sacramento Kings scouts
Saski Baskonia players
Seattle SuperSonics players
Washington Bullets draft picks
1998 FIBA World Championship players
2002 FIBA World Championship players